The Shearers and Rural Workers' Union is an Australian industrial union that is not registered with the Fair Work Commission and is also not affiliated with the Australian Council of Trade Unions.

They formed on 1 May 1994 in Victoria when members of the Australian Workers' Union split away due to the declining membership of the AWU; the increase in AWU dues; and, a perceived anti-democratic bureaucracy in the AWU.

References
Shearers support for Craig Johnston, 9 September 2004
"You need a real union," publication of the Shearers and Rural Workers' Union Ballarat, Victoria: (undated)

Further reading
"Building a fighting union"  [Interview with Steve Roach, Secretary SRWU] in Militant (Socialist Party Australia) September 1997. [Website outdated, may be deleted.]

Trade unions in Australia
Agriculture and forestry trade unions
Trade unions established in 1994
1994 establishments in Australia
Agricultural organisations based in Australia